"Sense and Senility"  is the fourth episode of the BBC sitcom Blackadder the Third, the third series of Blackadder. It originally aired on 8 October 1987. The title is a play on Jane Austen's Sense and Sensibility.

Plot
Blackadder is ruefully preparing to attend the theatre with Prince George, who has no grasp of the concept of fiction; for example, at a performance of Julius Caesar, the Prince shouted, "Look behind you, Mr. Caesar!" during the assassination scene. At the play, an anarchist (played by Ben Elton) makes an attempt on George's life. The Prince is shocked by Blackadder's revelation that he is unpopular and ignorant of the living conditions of the working classes: "Disease and deprivation stalk our land like two giant stalking things." Following this event, Prince George becomes anxious about anarchist attacks. Whenever the Prince encounters Baldrick cleaning, he accuses Baldrick of being an anarchist and attempts to strangle him.

Blackadder suggests that the Prince should improve his public image and writes a speech for the Prince to deliver at his father's birthday celebrations. The Prince then suggests that the two actors that they saw at the theatre (David Keanrick and Enoch Mossop, played respectively by Hugh Paddick and Kenneth Connor) be hired to give him elocution lessons. Blackadder has little respect for actors in the first place, often ridiculing them for their over-the-top, flamboyant acting style, and saying, "You mean they actually rehearse? I thought they just got drunk, stuck on silly hats and trusted their luck." Blackadder torments Keanrick and Mossop by having them repeatedly perform the painful Macbeth ritual (which comically consists of them playing pattycake and chanting "Hot potato, orchestra stalls, Puck will make amends!" before squeezing each other's nose). He says "Macbeth" six times in a row, making the actors continually repeat their ritual. Soon, he takes an additional dislike to the pair when they laugh at the speech he wrote, calling it "drivel", so he plans to quit being a servant and apply to become King of Sardinia (responding to an advertisement in The Times placed by Napoleon Bonaparte). However, he is distracted when, on the way out, Baldrick insults him, saying "Goodbye, you lazy, big nosed, rubber-faced bastard." Uncharacteristically, he does not touch Baldrick, but instead scathingly tells him "I wouldn't bet you a single groat that you could last five minutes here without me."

Soon after this, the actors rehearse their own play which they wrote themselves, The Bloody Murder of the Foul Prince Romero and His Enormously Bosomed Wife, which consists mostly of long and very gory Shakespearean-style dialogue. Baldrick overhears them and thinks it is a real plot to murder Prince George and Blackadder. As Baldrick and the Prince are cowering in the sitting room, Blackadder returns, revealing that he had actually decided to take Baldrick up on his bet, saying "Four minutes, twenty-two seconds, Baldrick. You owe me a groat." He then takes advantage of George's inability to tell fact from fiction and accuses the actors of conspiracy, claiming that The Murder of Prince Romero is in fact "their entire conspiracy printed and published in play manuscript form".  They are led off by the guards as Edmund adds insult to injury by again invoking the dreaded Scottish curse.

Blackadder then offers the Prince a lead role in a new play. The Prince agrees, but asks for the title. Blackadder replies, Thick Jack Clot Sits in the Stocks and Gets Pelted with Rancid Tomatoes. The credits roll after George says, "Excellent!".

In contemporary culture
Comparisons have been drawn between the "heroic stance" the actors teach Prince George and power posing.

References

External links
 
 

Blackadder episodes
1987 British television episodes
Television shows written by Ben Elton
Television shows written by Richard Curtis